Calgary-Varsity is a provincial electoral district in Calgary, Alberta, Canada. The district was created in 1993 and returns a single member to the Legislative Assembly of Alberta.

It comprises the communities of Varsity, Dalhousie, Brentwood, Banff Trail, University Heights, Parkdale, Point Mckay, and Charleswood (part of the Triwood community which also includes Collingwood west of 19th St NW.

History
The electoral district was created in the 1993 boundary redistribution out of parts of three electoral districts. They were Calgary-Foothills, Calgary-North Hill and Calgary-North West.

The 2010 boundary redistribution saw the district only slightly altered. It picked up some land from Calgary-Bow and Calgary-Mountain View when the south boundary was moved south to run completely along the Bow River and it also picked up a few blocks of houses from Calgary-North Hill when the east boundary between 17th Ave NW and 24 Ave NW was moved one block over to 18 Street NW

Boundary history

Representation history

The electoral district was created in 1993 and comprised land that had existed in three electoral districts. The region at that era had returned a mixture of Liberal and Progressive Conservative representatives.

In the first election in the district held in 1993, the district saw a closely contested race between Progressive Conservative candidate Murray Smith and Liberal candidate Carrol Jaques. Smith would win with a plurality of 47%. Premier Ralph Klein appointed Smith to his first cabinet post as Minister of Economic Development and Tourism in 1994. He would be shuffled to the Labour portfolio in 1996.

Smith and Jaques faced each other again in the 1997 election with both candidates losing popular vote. Smith however won his second term by taking a majority of the ballots cast. After the election Smith kept his Labour portfolio until 1999 when he was shuffled to be the Minister of Gaming.

The 2001 election would see Jaques and Smith face each other for the third time. The result would be a near landslide in Smith's favour. After the election Smith would once again change cabinet portfolios this time becoming Minister of Energy until he retired at dissolution of the assembly in 2004.

Liberal candidate Harry Chase was elected as the second representative of the riding in the 2004 election with nearly 45% of the vote. He won his second term in 2008 with a slightly larger plurality.

In 2012 Progressive Conservative candidate Donna Kennedy-Glans was elected with 46% of the vote. She briefly sat as an independent in protest of Alison Redford's leadership.

In 2015 New Democrat candidate Stephanie McLean was elected with 44% of the vote. After serving in the cabinet of Rachel Notley, she stepped down as MLA shortly before the 2019 election.

Despite the NDP attracting a star candidate to run in Calgary-Varsity, Anne McGrath, she was defeated by United Conservative candidate Jason Copping, who is the district's current representative.

Legislature results

Elections in the 1990s

|}

|}

Elections in the 2000s

|}

|}

|}

Elections in the 2010s

Senate nominee results

Voters had the option of selecting 4 Candidates on the Ballot

Student Vote results

On November 19, 2004 a Student Vote was conducted at participating Alberta schools to parallel the 2004 Alberta general election results. The vote was designed to educate students and simulate the electoral process for persons who have not yet reached the legal majority. The vote was conducted in 80 of the 83 provincial electoral districts with students voting for actual election candidates. Schools with a large student body that reside in another electoral district had the option to vote for candidates outside of the electoral district then where they were physically located.

References

External links 
The Legislative Assembly of Alberta

Alberta provincial electoral districts
Politics of Calgary